Love to the Grave (Amharic: ፍቅር እስከ መቃብር) is an Amharic novel by Haddis Alemayehu published in 1968. It is one of the best known novels in Ethiopia and is considered a classic of Ethiopian literature. The novel gained popularity largely due to its widespread dissemination on Ethiopian radio during the Derg regime. It was featured on the popular radio program "Kemetsahifit Alem" (The world of Books) by host Wegayehu Nigatu. The author himself later praised Wegayehu for quote "giving life to the characters in the story" with his narration of the novel.
An English translation, titled Love Unto Crypt, was done by Sisay Ayenew, using the title Love Unto Crypt, 2005.

Plot 
Bezabeh is one of leading characters in the novel, and the only child of Wudenesh Betamu and Bogale Mebratu. The story interchanged when Bezabeh turned ill during his infancy and childhood. When he was young, Bogale lost his parents and lived in poor condition until he encounters a rich woman named Wudenesh, whose three husbands tragically died. Priest Tamiru struggled to bring them unit, why the story titled Fikir Eske Mekaber.

Once they married two years later, they conceived a boy named Bezabeh to describe the consecutive illnesses encountered the child until the age of fifth age. At the three months, Bezabeh suffered from disease named "Ankelis", at the age of 6, he suffered from respiratory ailment called "kuwakuat" and measles at the end of year. These combination of diseases nearly would kill him.

The story tells that when he had Ankelis, symptoms started with chronic fever with shortness of breath. His father pushed the from room as he escape from death, and stunned father checked if he is alive, and his mother pray aloud for the boy from dying. The boy immensely sleeps deeply before awaking surprisedly with yawn and laughing.

The symptom of Ankelis fits with febrile seizure, hinting the chronic fever accompanied by convulsion. Besides this, the child also experienced twitching or rigidity in one portion of his body.  Although scariest to his parents, the condition is harmless. Haddis noted that the Ankelis is caused by his near-death experience.

The books centres on a romance between the beautiful Seble, daughter of a nobleman called Meshesha. She remains unmarried as nobody is considered noble enough for her, but when a tutor arrives they fall in love. Sahle Sellassie Berhane Mariam, commissioned by Heinemann to write a report on the book ahead of a potential translation wrote:"Masterfully grafted to this love theme unfolds another, more serious story - the relation of the tradit1onal nobleman Meshesha and his peasant-tenants, a relation that ends in a peasants' revolt, and the subsequent humiliation of the captured Meshesha. The leader of the peasant revolt does not kill Meshesha. He prefers to make him a laughing stock to all who know him by capturing him alive and taking him to the provincial court...

Feker Eske Mekaber [Love Unto Death] is not only the longest Amharic novel so far written (about 106,000 words), but also the best in many ways. The language is clear and beautiful although sometimes ecclesiastical jargons that are inevitably sprayed here and there are difficult to understand for those readers (including myself) unfamiliar with Geez, the classical Ethiopian language. Otherwise the words are vivid and reveal the imaginative grasp of the author...

For the post war Ethiopian generation Feker Eske Mekaber is a social history; a social history that is groaning under the pressures of modernity, but that is not totally dead and buried. 

A proper translation of the book into English and some other languages will reveal that the theme is closer to the social-setting of Europe and Russia of the pre-industrial era than to that of the present day Africa. It bears no resemblance to the themes developed by other [African] writers of today."

Reception 
The novel is one of the most famous in Ethiopia. It is particularly popular among those individuals who lived through the 1970s and 80's during the Derg regime, during which it was once narrated over the radio. A music video titled "Mar Eske Twauf" by the award winning Ethiopian music star Teddy Afro based on this novel was released on YouTube.

References

Relevant literature
Abakano, Bezaye. 2010. Dynamic Equivalence and Formal Correspondence in Sisay Ayenew’s "Love Unto Crypt". Addis Ababa University: MA thesis. Online access

1968 novels
Ethiopian books
Amharic-language books